Livada is a village in the municipality of Struga, North Macedonia.

Demographics
As of the 2021 census, Livada had 1,132 residents with the following ethnic composition:
Albanians 1,111
Persons for whom data are taken from administrative sources 19
Others 2

According to the 2002 census, the village had a total of 1485 inhabitants. Ethnic groups in the village include:
Albanians 1388
Macedonians 1
Others 96

References

External links

Villages in Struga Municipality
Albanian communities in North Macedonia